Tullich is a village in Aberdeenshire, Scotland.  It is known as the birthplace of St. Nathalan and also as the site of some noted Pictish stones.

The church is the site of a ruined church, built in around 1400. It has been suggested that the medieval church was constructed on the same site as a 7th-century chapel established by Nathalan.

References

Further reading
 Ordnance Survey Landranger Series: sheets 37 & 44 (2000)

External links
 Aberdeenshire Council official site: Tullich Kirkyard (2006)

Villages in Aberdeenshire